The Jundee Gold Mine is an active gold mine in Western Australia, approximately 47 km north east of the town of Wiluna, owned by Northern Star Resources.

History

The Jundee mine was opened in 1995, originally as an open pit operation and, from 1997, also as an underground mine.

Originally, the mine was owned to 51% by Great Central Mines, which acquired the remaining 49% in early 1995 for US$89 million, alongside 30% of the Bronzewing Gold Mine.

In 1997, the Jundee mine was enlarged with the acquisition of the nearby Nimary Gold Mine, owned by the Eagle Mining Corporation NL.

Great Central Mines, with Jundee, Bronzewing and the Wiluna Gold Mine, was taken over by Normandy Mining in June 2000 and Normandy, in turn, by the Newmont Mining Corporation in February 2002. Newmont sold the operations to Northern Star Resources in 2014.

The mine was operating as an open pit and underground mine until 2007, when the last open pit closed. Newmont planned to return to open pit mining in 2010 if drilling results were positive. Open pit mining commenced again under the subsequent owner, Northern Star Resources, during the 2019–20 financial year.

In June 2014, Northern Star Resources completed the purchase of the mine from Newmont at a cost of $US82.5 million. Earlier in the year, Northern Star had already purchased the Plutonic, Kanowna Belle and Kundana Gold Mines from Barrick Gold for US$100 million, making the company Australia's second-largest gold producer, behind Newmont, at the time.

Production

Jundee
Annual production of the mine:

Yandal Production Centre
Production figures for the mine under the ownership of Northern Star Resources. From 2020, Northern Star reported combined figures for the Yandal Production Centre, which consist of Jundee and the Bronzewing Gold Mine. The Thunderbox Gold Mine was also added to the Yandal operations in 2021 period but production figures were reported separately for 2020–21. The Bronzewing mine, acquired in 2019, remained in care and maintenance:

Notes

 Production figure is for the combined Yandal Production Centre, which consists of the Jundee and Bronzewing Gold Mine. The Bronzewing mine remained in care and maintenance during the 2019 to 2021 period. The Thunderbox Gold Mine was also added to the Yandal operations during that time period but production figures were reported separately.
 Figures for January to September 2002.

References

Bibliography

External links 
 
 MINEDEX website: Jundee - Nimary Database of the Department of Mines, Industry Regulation and Safety

Gold mines in Western Australia
Underground mines in Australia
Surface mines in Australia
Shire of Wiluna
Newmont